Pollex diabolo is a moth of the family Erebidae first described by Michael Fibiger in 2007. It is known from Balawan in the Philippines.

The wingspan is about 10 mm. The forewing is narrow and light brown in the medial and anterior part of the subterminal areas, other areas of the forewing are blackish brown. The hindwing is unicolorous grey brown with an indistinct black discal spot and the underside unicolorous grey brown.

References

Micronoctuini
Moths described in 2007